Khanjar (translation: dagger) is a 1980 Hindi language film, produced and directed by Atmaram. This action thriller casts Navin Nischol in the lead with the supporting cast of Reena Roy, Suresh Oberoi, Amjad Khan, Jankidas, Jayshree T., Jeevan, K. N. Singh, Mehmood, Murad, Reeta Bhaduri, Sajjan and Shekhar Kapur. Nitin Mangeshkar scored the music for this film, with lyrics written by Maya Govind.

The story, in brief, is about a dagger in a criminal investigation, and the mysterious deaths around the life of its custodian.

Plot
Prakash (Navin Nischol), a librarian, lives with his daughter. One day, his friend and private detective Captain Usman (Suresh Oberoi)  visits him and gives him a diary along with a dagger (khanjar) to safeguard them. He also informs Prakash about their importance for a case under his investigation and that he has been threatened by some gangsters about them. Soon after this, Prakash learns that Usman is murdered. He also receives a call from a stranger inquiring about Usman's diary and the dagger. Meanwhile, a smart girl named Preeti (Reena Roy) starts to flirt and get closer to him to know about the diary and the dagger. Prakash notices her acts, and illustrates to the police the story of Usman's diary, the dagger, his murder and Preeti's attempts for them. They instruct him to follow her to learn about the gangsters she works with. Upon his insistence, Preeti informs him about her activities under the instructions of Prince (Amjad Khan). Soon Prince learns about her behaviour and kills her. After a few days, his brother-in-law Ramesh (Shekhar Kapur), married to his younger sister Jyoti (Rita Bhaduri), is also found murdered. Disturbed by these mysterious murders leading to the dagger, Prakash and his magician friends Jagat (Mehmood) and Rasvanti (Jashree T.) visit an old town, Udaigarh, famous for Swamiji (Amjad Khan). One mystery leads to a deeper mystery and a series of thrilling events unravel the mystery of the khanjar.

Cast
Navin Nischol as Prakash
Reena Roy as Nisha / Madhu / Preeti (Double Role)
Jayshree T. as Rasvanti
Mehmood as Jagat
Amjad Khan as Zorawar Singh 'Swamiji' / Shamsher Singh 'Prince' (Double Role)
Jeevan as Dr. Prem
Suresh Oberoi as Captain Usman
Reeta Bhaduri as Jyothi
Shekhar Kapur as Ramesh
Gauri Verma
Jankidas
K. N. Singh
Manik Irani
Mridula
Murad
Raja Duggal
Sajjan
Sunder Taneja

Crew
Direction – Atmaram
Story – Ram Govind
Screenplay – Ram Govind
Dialogue – Ram Govind
Production – Atmaram
Production Company – Gurudutt Films
Editing – E. G. Shinde
Cinematography – K. R. Murthy, Yusuf
Art Direction – L. G. Patil
Costume Design – Leena Shah, Mani Rabadi
Action Direction – Ravi Khanna
Choreography – Kamal
Background Music – Anil Mohile, Arun Paudwal
Music Direction – Nitin Mangeshkar
Lyrics – Maya Govind
Playback – Anjali, Arati Mukherjee, Aziz Nazan, Jaspal Singh, Mahmood, Usha Timothy

Soundtrack

References

External links

1980 films
1980s Hindi-language films